Maximiliano Alberto Schenfeld Bou (born 18 October 1992) is a Chilean footballer who plays as a left-back.

Career

Youth
As a child, Schenfeld was with Academia Kico Rojas in his birthplace, Ovalle. Next, he spent a year with Coquimbo Unido before moving to Argentina, where he spent time Banfield, Tigre, Platense and Ferro Carril Sud. He also briefly returned to Chile with Barnechea.

College
Schenfeld moved to the United States in 2013 to play college soccer at Florida Memorial University. He made 14 appearances, scoring 2 goals and tallying 2 assists for the Lions. In 2014, he transferred to Indiana University–Purdue University Indianapolis, but redshirted the whole season after not been cleared to compete. He played a season with Florida National University in 2018, .

Professional
Schenfeld spent time with NPSL sides Miami Fusion and Miami United. 

In 2019, he moved to Miami FC for their inaugural and only season in the NISA.

On 18 December 2019, Schenfeld joined USL Championship side FC Tulsa ahead of the 2020 season. However, he did not appear for the club in any competition.

On 22 April 2021, Schenfeld signed with USL League One side FC Tucson.

Schenfeld signed with USL League One side Central Valley Fuego on 10 March 2022 ahead of their inaugural season.

Personal
Maxi's father is the Argentine former professional footballer Alberto Aníbal Schenfeld, who played for Deportes Ovalle, and also coached it in 2012.

At the same time he played for Florida Memorial Lions, he graduated with a Bachelor of Psychology at Florida Memorial University.

References

1992 births
Living people
People from Ovalle
Chilean people of Argentine descent
Chilean footballers
Association football defenders
IUPUI Jaguars men's soccer players
A.C. Barnechea footballers
Miami Fusion players
Miami FC players
FC Tulsa players
FC Tucson players
Central Valley Fuego FC players
Primera B de Chile players
National Premier Soccer League players
National Independent Soccer Association players
USL League One players
Chilean expatriate footballers
Chilean expatriate sportspeople in Argentina
Chilean expatriate sportspeople in the United States
Expatriate footballers in Argentina
Expatriate soccer players in the United States